Neuromedin may refer to:

 Neuromedin B
 Neuromedin N
 Neuromedin S
 Neuromedin U